Ahmet Enis Batur (born 28 June 1952, Eskişehir, Turkey) is a Turkish poet, essayist, novelist, and editor.

Education
Born in Eskişehir on 28 June 1952, Enis Batur studied at St. Joseph High School Istanbul, METU-Sociology (Ankara), and Sorbonne University (Paris).

Career
Enis Batur is one of the leading figures in contemporary Turkish literature with a large body of work, extending to over a hundred volumes. Some of his works have been translated into European languages including French, English and Italian.

He was a chief-editor at the Yapı Kredi Yayınları since 2017.

Bibliography
 Nil (1975, Yapıt; 1998, 4. edition, Altıkırkbeş)
 Ayna (1977, Ada)
 İblise Göre İncil (1979, Yeni Ankara; 2001, 4. edition, Altıkırkbeş)
 Şiir ve İdeoloji (1979, Derinlik)
 Kandil (1981, Ada; 2001, 4. edition, Altıkırkbeş)
 Tahta Troya (1981, Yazko)
 Tuğralar (1985, Tan; 1993, expanded 3. edition, Remzi)
 Sarnıç (1985, Nisan; 1996, 4. edition, Altıkırkbeş)
 Alternatif: Aydın (1985, Hil)
 Babil Yazıları (1986, AFA)
 Viyana İçin Siyah Vals (1987, BFS)
 Estetik Ütopya (1987, BFS)
 Yazılar ve Tuğralar (1987, BFS)
 İki/z (1988, BFS)
 Bu Kalem Bukalemun (1988, Hil; 1997, 2001, YKY)
 Eşittir Sonsuz (1988, BFS)
 Kediler Krallara Bakabilir (1990, Remzi; 1996, İyi Şeyler; 2002, Sel)
 Koma Provaları (1990, 1998, Altıkırkbeş)
 Söz'lük (1990, Düzlem)
 Gönderen: Enis Batur(1991, Remzi; 2000, Sel)
 Hatay'da Bir Rolls-Royce (1991, Altıkırkbeş)
 Perişey (1992, 1993, Remzi; 1998, 3. basım, Altıkırkbeş)
 Küçük Kıpırtı Tarihi (1992, Boyut)
 Kırkpâre (1992, Remzi; 2001, Sel)
 Şiir ve İdeoloji (1992, Mitos)
 Yazının Ucu (1993, 1994, YKY)
 Gesualdo (1993, 1994, YKY)
 Akabe (1994, Mitos)
 Ağlayan Kadınlar Lahdi (1994, Harf)
 Kandil, Yazı Şiirler 1973 - 1985 (1994, Altıkırkbeş)
 Ondört + X + 4 (1994, © Yayın)
 Taşrada Ölüm Dirim Hazırlıkları (1995, Oğlak)
 Günebakan I: Alternatif: Aydın (1995, Ark)
 Günebakan II: Saatsız Maarif Takvimi (1995, Ark)
 Darb ve Mesel (1995, 1995, Altıkırkbeş)
 E/Babil Yazıları (1995, 2003 YKY)
 Modernlerin Gecesi (1995, Altıkırkbeş)
 Opera 1-4004 (1996, Altıkırkbeş)
 Kesif - Saint-Nazaire Günlüğü (1996, Mitos)
 Yolcu (1996, İyi Şeyler)
 Ya/zar (1996, © Yayınları)
 İki Deniz Arası Siyah Topraklar (1997, YKY)
 Bu Kalem Melûn © (1997, 2001, YKY)
 Seyrüsefer Defteri (1997, YKY)
 Frenhoferolmak (1997, Sel)
 Doğu-Batı Dîvanı (1997, 1998, 2002, YKY)
 Aciz çağ, faltaşları (1998, 2003 YKY)
 Türkiye'nin Üçlemi (1998, Papirüs)
 Sütte Ne Çok Kan (1998, Altıkırkbeş)
 Issız Dönme Dolap (1998, YKY)
 Su, Tüyün Üzerinde Bekler (1999, Sel)
 Kurşunkalem Portreler (1999, 2000, Sel)
 Amerika Büyük Bir Şaka (1999, 2000, YKY)
 Kanat Hareketleri (2000, 2000, Altıkırkbeş)
 Cüz (2000, Sel)
 Başkalaşımlar I - X (1992, 2000, YKY)
 Başkalaşımlar XI - XX (2000, YKY)
 Acı Bilgi, Fugue Sanatı Üzerine Bir Roman Denemesi (2000, 2000, 2002 YKY)
 Smokinli Berduş, Şiir Yazıları 1974 - 2000 (2001, YKY)
 Yazboz (2001, Sel)
 Kum Saatından Harfler (2001, YKY)
 Elma, Örgü Teknikleri Üzerine Bir Roman Denemesi (2001, 2002, Sel)
 İçinizde Kaç Koridor Var? (2001, YKY)
 Son Kare (2002, Altıkırkbeş)
 Şehren'is (2002, Literatür Yayınları)
 Papirüs, Mürekkep, Tüy: Seçme Şiirler 1973-2002 (June 2002, YKY)
 Başka Yollar (September 2002, YKY)
 Bir Varmış, Bir Okmuş (November 2002, Sel)
 Abdal Düşü: Düzyazı Şiirler 1998-2002 (March 2003, Altıkırkbeş)
 Ağırlaştırıcı Sebepler Divanı (December 2003, Altıkırkbeş)
 Bekçi (March 2003, Oğlak)
 Kravat (April 2003, Sel)
 Bu Kalem Un Ufak (2004, Okuyanus)
 Kütüphane (2005, Sel)
 Gövde'm (2007, Sel)
 Sır:bir oynaşı (2009, İstanbul:Sel Yayıncılık)
 Basit Bir Es* (2015, İstanbul: Kırmızı Kedi)

External links
 Enis Batur Official website
 Texts and poems of Enis Batur 
 Poems of Enis Batur

Living people
1952 births
People from Eskişehir
St. Joseph High School Istanbul alumni
Middle East Technical University alumni
University of Paris alumni
20th-century Turkish writers
Turkish essayists
Turkish expatriates in France